Glyn Davidge (31 December 1933 – 18 March 2006) was a Welsh international flanker who played club rugby for Tredegar and Newport. He was awarded nine caps for Wales and toured with Arthur Smith's 1962 British Lions squad.

Club career
During the 1952–53 season, at the age of 18, Davidge played for Newport having previously been a member of Tredegar. As an adolescent, he had shown form and had played for Wales Youth, but before he could start a second season with Newport was called up for National Service. In the Army he joined the South Wales Borderers and represented The Army rugby team. On his return to civilian life he rejoined Newport who he would play for until 1965. He captained Newport during the 1962–63 season. While at Newport he would play in the teams that faced all three great Southern Hemisphere sides, New Zealand, Australia and South Africa. He was on the winning side against Australia (1957) and New Zealand (1963), but Newport were narrowly defeated 3–0 by the 1961 touring South Africans. Although losing the game, Davidge was considered to have been the most outstanding forward on the field that day. Davidge controlled the Springbok's attack and tackled heavily at every opportunity. Davidge was also a keen player of rugby sevens and was part of the Newport team that won the Snelling Sevens on three occasions between 1961 and 1963.

International career
Davidge was selected to represent Wales on 4 April 1959 against France at Stade Colombes. He would play for Wales nine time in total including the South Africans who he would later play so well against for Newport.

Davidge was selected to play in the 1962 British Lions tour to South Africa, but was injured after playing three games against club opposition.

International matches played
Wales
  1961
  1959, 1960, 1962
  1960, 1961
  1960, 1961
  1960

Bibliography

References

1933 births
2006 deaths
British & Irish Lions rugby union players from Wales
Newport RFC players
Rugby union players from Newport, Wales
Tredegar RFC players
Wales international rugby union players
Welsh rugby union players
Rugby union flankers